Rory Cowlam (born 27 August 1992), otherwise known as Rory the Vet, is a British veterinary surgeon, writer and television personality, who rose to prominence through the CBBC documentary series The Pets Factor. He currently works as a  vet in South London and is a co-founder of veterinary app VidiVet alongside his media career. In August 2020 his autobiography, “The Secret Life of A Vet”, was released, in which he shines a light on mental health in the veterinary profession. He is currently the resident vet for Blue Peter.

An ambassador for the RSPCA and Streetvet, he is known for his strong stance on sustainability and animal welfare.

Early life
Rory Alexander Cowlam was born in Ascot, but moved to the Cotswolds aged four, with his parents and younger sister. There he grew up surrounded by animals, to which he attributes his lifelong passion for them. He attended Marling School in Stroud, before going to study veterinary medicine at The Royal Veterinary College in London.

Career

Veterinary

Cowlam’s first vet job was at an animal hospital in Kent, doing shift work. He then moved to a practice in South London, where he currently works as one of the leading surgeons, specialising in soft tissue operations.

Television
In 2017 Cowlam landed a leading role in the CBBC documentary series, The Pets Factor, which follows the work of him and four other vets. Since then he has featured on several television shows and documentaries providing veterinary advice and insights, including Lorraine, Sky News and on Channel 5, as well as on various radio programs. Since 2019 he has been the resident vet for Blue Peter, with regular appearances on the show.

Writing
In August 2020 Cowlam’s debut book, “The Secret Life of a Vet” was published by Hodder & Stoughton. This autobiographical work details his journey to becoming a vet, with a particular focus on mental health in the veterinary profession.

References

English veterinarians
BBC television presenters
21st-century English writers
People from Ascot, Berkshire
Living people
1992 births